Álvaro de Bazán may refer to:
Álvaro de Bazán the Elder, Spanish admiral father of the 1st Marquis of Santa Cruz
Álvaro de Bazán, 1st Marquis of Santa Cruz, a Spanish admiral of the 16th century
Álvaro de Bazán, 2nd Marquis of Santa Cruz (1571–1646)
Álvaro de Bazán-class gunboat, a class of gunboats operated by the Spanish Navy
Spanish gunboat Álvaro de Bazán, lead ship of the Álvaro de Bazán class gunboats
Álvaro de Bazán-class frigate, a five-ship class of air defence frigates currently operated by the Spanish Navy
Spanish frigate Álvaro de Bazán (F101), lead ship of the Álvaro de Bazán-class frigates